Maea is a name. Notable people with this name include:

 Des Maea (born 1969), New Zealand rugby player
 Maea David (born 1972), New Zealand rugby coach player
 Maea Teuhema (born 1996), American American football player
 Terepai Maea (born 1967), Cook Islands boxer